Carlo J. Caparas' Ang Panday is a 2017 Filipino superhero fantasy action film based on the eponymous comic book character created by Carlo J. Caparas along with his co-creator Steve Gan. Serving as the seventh installment of the Panday series, the film is directed and produced by Coco Martin, who also stars in the title role.

The film serves as an official entry to the 2017 Metro Manila Film Festival, and marks Martin's directorial debut under his real name, Rodel Nacianceno. The film received mixed reviews.

Plot
Flavio II and his wife Carmen take care of their newborn baby boy, whom they dream of becoming the next heroic legend. They offer the pious Rosa Batungbakal to take care of him, but the malevolent Lizardo's unlatched spirit and his goons attack the unprotected house. Rosa takes the newborn to the church to offer guidance from a priest while Flavio fends off the goons. Flavio gets stabbed and dies after fighting the spirit, who vows to rule the world.

The newborn baby later grew up to be Flavio Batungbakal III, a gangster who ambushes bandits around the market in Tondo, only to get apprehended by the police. Flavio is released from prison, and his stepfather Andoy warns him not to cause havoc around the streets anymore. He lives a comfortable life along with his family and regularly meets with Maria, a beautiful woman with whom he admits being smitten, although her parents disapprove of him. Meanwhile, a new human form of Lizardo appears in the shadows alongside his father. He is strongly attracted to Maria and craves to be with her. A beauty contest competition nearby is under way, which goes awry.

Citizens turn into aswangs and secretly devise a plot to destroy Flavio's hometown, and replace it with their own. During the cataclysm, an aswang disguised as a dog bites one of Flavio's younger brother, Diego, who insists that the injury is minor. Lizardo successfully latch onto his human form, making him the leader of the aswangs planning to rule the country. Flavio realizes that he is being followed by an old man holding a magical book which contains a mysterious power. When the old man tells him about the real existence of the aswangs, he threatens him by pulling out his butterfly knife out of disbelief. An aswang suddenly appears, which the two men defeat. The old man realizes that Flavio is the only known person of his bloodline capable of stopping Lizardo and his army.

Flavio is handed a map and starts his quest by riding a bus to search for the mythical dagger. While embarking through the forest, its surroundings suddenly changes into a magical kingdom. He encounters several dwarves, whom he asks about the location of the dagger. After seeing a diwata, Flavio asks the king and queen where the dagger is. He challenges a skilled swordsman, whom he defeats, and retrieves the dagger in a cave. He summons the dagger upwards, creating a shockwave which turns it into a double-edged sword, the sword of his grandfather, the original Panday.

He returns to Tondo and wields his grandfather's sword to defeat most of the aswangs in the hospital, train station and several communities. Diego is severely infected from one of the creature's bite and would later turn into a monster. Although distressed from his brother's plight, Flavio continues to defend the city but gets fatally stabbed by Lizardo. He falls into a coma, but is resurrected and healed by the old man. He embarks into a highland and is informed that he is not ready to fight Lizardo unless he undergoes a training and forge his sword. After his successful training, he is summoned into a desert world where he fights numerous goons. The voice of darkness enhances Lizardo's power to ensure he would win. As the voice of darkness disappears, Flavio battles Lizardo in a sword fight, which he wins after stabbing Lizardo in his weak spot to death.

Flavio visits the church with his family and Maria to commemorate their victory against Lizardo. He vows to continue saving the world from further malevolent threats.

Cast

Coco Martin as Flavio Batungbakal III
 The grandson of the original blacksmith born in the urban ghetto of Tondo; a tough gang leader but apathetic when it comes to his grandmother. Family is always his priority while also being keen on becoming the king of the slums of Tondo.
Jeric Raval as Flavio Batungbakal II <ref
name="pandaywebsite"/>
 The father of Flavio III and the son of Flavio Sr..
Eddie Garcia as Lucifer <ref
name="pandaywebsite"/>
A demonic spirit who gives the new Lizardo ultimate and supreme power.
Jake Cuenca as Lizardo Montemayor
 The False Prophet and the descendant of previous Lizardo
Elisse Joson as Rowena
 The responsible sister in the Batungbakal household who helps Lola Rosa in keeping the family together. She is very vocal on her disgust to Flavio's gang activities.
Arjo Atayde as the Previous Lizardo <ref
name="pandaywebsite"/>
Lizardo's previous form and he is the one who killed Flavio II.
Gloria Romero as Rosa Batungbakal
 A former midwife who took care of Flavio. She did not have any children so she adopted abandoned kids and gave them a family. A loving woman, religious and very firm when it comes to disciplining her adopted children.
Dimples Romana as Carmen Batungbakal
The mother of Flavio.
Jaime Fabregas as Andoy Batungbakal
 The adoptive father of Flavio who raised him in a firm way.
Awra Briguela as Diego
 Flavio's younger brother who flaunts a tough stance to cover up on his being homosexual. 
Julio Diaz as Primo
 Andoy's brother and Flavio's partner-in-crime
Nayomi "Heart" Ramos as Ella
 The perky sister of Flavio who is persistent and very inquisitive.
Enzo "Bingo" Pelojero as Itoy
 The worrisome and pessimistic amongst the brood who is always anxious for his big brother Flavio.
James "Paquito" Sagarino as Empoy
 The young trouble maker in the family who plays tough cookie and acts like a sidekick to his brother and idol Flavio.
Cesar Montano as Police C/Insp. Erwin Rivera 
 A police chief officer in Tondo for mission order of his police members for manhunt operations against Lizardo's henchmen
Jhong Hilario as Sword Guard
 Flavio faced him to get the sword
Carmi Martin as Delilah
 The mother of Maria who dislikes Flavio.
Mariel de Leon as Maria
 Flavio's love interest.
John Medina as SPO3 Dela Cruz
He is one of the police officers in Tondo.
Lito Lapid as Apo 
He is the one who trains Flavio III to be ready to fight with Lizardo.
McCoy de Leon as Caloy
 A reluctant gang member who falls in love with the leader's sister Rowena.
Michael De Mesa as Eduardo Montemayor
 the father of Antonio, the present host of Lizardo.
Albert Martinez as the King of the Engkantos
the ruler of the Kingdom of the Engkantos.

Additional cast was also unveiled in Martin's Instagram profile, while they are on the press conference for the announcement: Agot Isidro, Al Vaughn Chier Tuliao, Albert Martinez, Alvin Anson, Ana de Leon, Benj Manalo, Carlos Morales, Dennis Padilla, Ejay Falcon, Epy Quizon, Jay Manalo, Jeff Tam, Jeffrey Santos, Jethro Ramirez, John Prats, John Regala, Joko Diaz, Joonee Gamboa, Kylie Verzosa, Lester Llansang, Long Mejia, Marc Solis, Mark Lapid, Michael De Mesa, Michael Roy Jornales, Mon Confiado, Onyok Pineda, Phoebe Walker, PJ Endrinal, Rhian "Dang" Ramos, Shantel Crislyn Layh "Ligaya" Nugyo, Vhong Navarro,Zaijian Jaranilla, Smugglaz, and Bassilyo.

Production

Announcement
On April 11, 2017, after winning a Your Face Sounds Familiar: Kids contest, child actor and comedian Awra Briguela stated that he has a new upcoming movie with lead actor Coco Martin. There were no official details revealed including the start of the film's production, and has yet to be titled.

Development
On April 25, 2017, it was announced that a new Panday reboot is in its development stage when Coco Martin was granted the rights from Carlo J. Caparas to green-light the film, which he will star and direct. The upcoming film of Coco Martin and Awra Briguela turned out to be the second reboot of Ang Panday, which was shown by Briguela, featuring and starring in a supporting role. This is the second time Martin will portray the role first envisioned by Fernando Poe Jr., the first being the twin brothers Ador and Cardo (Kardo in the film version) in the television adaptation of Ang Probinsyano.

Pre-production
Production on Ang Panday began on June 22, 2017, when Martin posted a picture of him holding a whiteboard with an establishing shot label along with his production crew. The working title was under the name "Panday". Before production began, Martin went to Manila North Cemetery to pay respect to the grave of Poe Jr. so he can get some assistance. He wanted his direction be inspired by prominent Filipino directors such as Mike De Leon and Lino Brocka.

On July 4, 2017, Martin confirmed the complete set of cast for the film. He revealed that Binibining Pilipinas International candidate Mariel de Leon would co-star in the film as Martin's leading lady, along with some of his co-stars in Ang Probinsyano, including Onyok Pineda and Awra Briguela.

On July 24, Jake Cuenca was cast as the key villain Lizardo.

On September 27, Martin has announced that one more beauty queen will be joining the Ang Panday cast besides Mariel de Leon. It was revealed on November 9, 2017, that Kylie Verzosa is the new beauty queen that joined the cast.

Filming
Principal photography began on July 9, 2017. On July 20, a video clip of Martin on the set of the film was posted on the actor's Instagram account. During filming, Cuenca was also given advice by lead actor and director Coco Martin on how to accomplish things correctly. Carlo J. Caparas was also involved in production by the said film, and he is open to random ideas for Coco Martin. Filming wrapped on October 25, 2017.

Soundtrack
On August 18, Filipino rapper and songwriter Gloc-9 posted in his Facebook account that he will write a song about a man who creates swords. On September 25, Gloc-9 shared an Instagram post by Coco Martin stating that the title of the theme song will be Ang Panday and the song will feature Ebe Dancel. The song was finally released on November 24, 2017, through digital platforms such as Spotify and Apple Music.

On November 24, the official music video for Peksman (an original song by the band Siakol) was uploaded on YouTube while the song was released on December 1. The song was sung by the movie's director, main cast and producer Coco Martin featuring Zaito, Basilyo, Jeff Tam, Smugglaz and Shernan. Also featuring FlipTop rappers Bassilyo, Smugglaz, Zaito, and Shernan, another single from the film was released entitled Mas Liligaya Ang Pasko with Coco Martin as its main artist. The song was released on December 15.

Release

The film is scheduled to be released on December 25, 2017, as an official submission entry of 2017 Metro Manila Film Festival. The official poster of Ang Panday was released on November 17, 2017; alongside another competing 2017 Metro Manila Film Festival entry, Gandarrapiddo: The Revenger Squad.

Box office
Ang Panday along with Gandarrapiddo: The Revenger Squad had a combined box office gross of ₱125 million in the opening day of the MMFF. It was later reported that Ang Panday was the second most sold film in the box office during the official run of the 2017 Metro Manila Film Festival grossing  behind The Revenger Squad. At the end of its box office run, the film grossed .

Critical response

The film drew mixed reviews from critics. Wanggo Gallaga of News5 wrote, "It's a huge story that keeps jumping from subplot to subplot. It's audacious in its presentation of this narrative." He added that it fails to live up to the audacity and bigness of its ambitions, the film scores 8.5 out of 10 via critics and audiences.

Accolades

Other media
A new tie-in game has been announced for release on iOS and Android. The game's plot involves Flavio on a quest to travel through different worlds and retrieve the powerful sword of Panday, while saving the world from evil forces.

Notes

References

External links
 

Panday
2017 films
2010s fantasy action films
Epic fantasy films
Filipino-language films
Films based on Philippine comics
Films shot in Manila
Philippine epic films
Philippine fantasy action films
Star Cinema films
Viva Films films
2017 directorial debut films